Dodworth Miners Welfare Football Club is a football club based in Dodworth, Barnsley, South Yorkshire, England.

History
The club spent three separate spells in the Yorkshire Football League, with a highest finish of 7th in Division Two, in their first season in the competition in 1959.

Season-by-season record

Ground
The club plays at the Dodworth Miners Welfare Ground, on High Street, Dodworth, postcode S75 3RF.

Honours

League
Sheffield & Hallamshire County Senior Football League Division One
Champions: 2017-18 
Sheffield & Hallamshire County Senior Football League Division Two
Champions: 2004-05, 2016-17 (Division Two North)

Cup
Sheffield & Hallamshire County FA Association Cup
Winners: 2016-17

References

Football clubs in England
Football clubs in South Yorkshire
Sheffield & Hallamshire County FA members
Yorkshire Football League
Sheffield & Hallamshire County Senior Football League
Wakefield and District Football Association League
South Yorkshire Amateur Football League
Mining association football teams in England